Sidney Corbett (born April 26, 1960 in Chicago, Illinois) is an American composer based in Germany.

Biography 
Sidney Corbett was born in Chicago in 1960, studied music and philosophy at the University of California, San Diego, and continued his study of composition at Yale University, where he earned his doctorate in 1989, and at the Hamburg Academy of the Arts with György Ligeti. Corbett has been active primarily in Europe since 1985. His output includes works for the stage, orchestral compositions, instrumental chamber music and a large amount of vocal music. His works have earned him numerous national and international awards and prizes and have been performed and broadcast worldwide.

A particular emphasis in his recent work has been in the area of music theatre. His chamber opera, "X UND Y", which was premiered at the Eclat Festival in Stuttgart in February 2002, the scenic work "Paradiso", after Dante, for speaker and string quartet, which also premiered in 2002, in Basle, the large scale opera, NOACH, after an original libretto by Christoph Hein, which ran very successfully in the 2001/2002 season at the Bremen Opera and his third opera, KEINE STILLE AUSSER DER DES WINDES (No Silence but that of the Wind), after texts by Fernando Pessoa, which premiered in the Concordia Theatre Bremen in January 2007 are all examples of this recent focus. The opera UBU, after Alfred Jarry with a libretto by Simone Home de Mello premiered at the opera house in Gelsenkirchen in April 2012. His most recent opera, “Das Große Heft”, after the novel by Agosta Kristof, premiered at the Osnabrück Opera in March, 2013.

A further emphasis has been on vocal music. Cycles on poems by Christina Lavant, Barbara Köhler, Paul Klee and others have emerged in recent years. Literary and theosophical subjects also inspire and inform his works. Yael", for solo violin and orchestra, draws upon the writings of Edmond Jabès and his Symphony No. 3, "Breathing the Water", commissioned by the Staatskapelle Berlin employs texts by the Iraqi poet Amal Al-Jubouri and the late American poet Denise Levertov. “Rasch”, commissioned by the Tonhalle in Düsseldorf employs texts by Roland Barthes. Corbett has also received commissions from the Berlin Philharmonic, MusikFabrik, West German Radio, Radio Symphony Orchestra Stuttgart among many others. He is currently at work on a piece commissioned by the Siemens Foundation for Ensemble Aventure.

CDs featuring Corbett's music have been released on Cybele, CRI, Mode, Zeitklang, Ambitus, BIS and Kreuzberg Records. In 2011 a CD with his music for violin was released on Blue Griffin records, performed by Sarah Plum. In 2013 a new portrait CD will be released on the label, Edition Kopernikus, performed by the Modern Art Ensemble. Corbett’s music is published by Edition Nova Vita, Berlin, and distributed worldwide by C.F. Peters. Sidney Corbett is currently professor for composition at the University of the Performing Arts in Mannheim. Corbett currently resides with his wife and three children in Berlin, Germany.

Works 

 Stage
 Noach (Opera, 1995) (based on the libretto by Christoph Hein), first performed in 2001
 X Und Y (Chamber Opera, 2001), first performed during the Eclat Festival Stuttgart in 2002
 Paradiso, for Speaker and String Quartet (based on Dante), first performed in Basel in 2002
 Keine Stille Ausser Der Des Windes (Chamber Opera, 2007) (based on texts by Fernando Pessoa) (commissioned by the Bremer Theater), first performed in 2007
 Orchestral
 Tympan (Symphony No.1, 1992)
 Posaunenkonzert (Concerto for Trombone and Orchestra, 1994)
 The Immaculate Sands (Symphony No.2, 2004), first performed in 2004
 Yeal, for Violin and Orchestra (2005), first performed by Kolja Lessing and the Concertino Basel in 2005
 Exits, for Electric Guitar and Chamber Orchestra (composed for Seth Josel and the Ensemble MusikFabrik NRW) first performed in 2005
 Breathing Water (Symphony No.3, 2006)
 Vocal
 Chamber
 Die Stimme Der Wände (1993)
 Caverna (1994)
 Kammersinfonie (Chamber Symphony, 1995)
 Gesänge Der Unruhe (2003)
 String Quartet "Fractured Eden" (commissioned by the Düsseldorfer Tonhalle, composed for the Auryn Quartett), first performed on 28 May 2006
 Valse Triste

Literature 

Sidney Corbett: Auf der Suche: Zum Tode des amerikanischen Komponisten Jacob Druckman, Neue Zeitschrift für Musik Nr.4, Juli/August 1996, Schott Verlag, Mainz (in German)
Sidney Corbett: Die amerikanische Neue-Musik-Szene: Der subjektive Überblick eines Komponisten, Musik und Ästhetik, Klett-Cotta Verlag, Stuttgart (Heft 6/98) (in German)
Sidney Corbett: Verzicht ist eine Antwort, zu den Begriffen Fortschritt, Avanciertheit und Avantgarde Musik und Ästhetik, Heft 33, Januar 2005, Klett-Cotta Verlag, Stuttgart (in German)

External links 
 
 Biography on the website of the Musikhochschule Mannheim 

1960 births
Living people
American male classical composers
American classical composers
20th-century classical composers
21st-century classical composers
University of California, San Diego alumni
Pupils of Jacob Druckman
Pupils of Pauline Oliveros
Pupils of Martin Bresnick
21st-century American composers
20th-century American composers
20th-century American male musicians
21st-century American male musicians